The 1973 Speedway World Pairs Championship was the fourth FIM Speedway World Pairs Championship. The final took place in Borås, Sweden. The championship was won by the host country Sweden (24 points). The silver medal was won by Denmark who beat Poland after a run-off (both 21 points).

Semifinal 1
  Bydgoszcz
 May 13

Semifinal 2
  Poole
 May 23

World final
  Borås
 8 June 1973

See also
 1973 Individual Speedway World Championship
 1973 Speedway World Team Cup
 motorcycle speedway
 1973 in sports

References

1973
World Pairs